Fife High School is located in Fife, Washington. FHS is the only high school in the Fife Public Schools system.

History
Fife High School initially consisted of the upper grades of the general Fife School, founded on December 23, 1899. In 1904, a two-story building was built in the same location, on Dyslin road. The high school was officially separated from the lower grades in 1930, when the new high school building was completed. A two room school was built in the site of the present high school. At that time, the official school colors of Royal blue and gold were chosen.

STEAM center 
The STEAM (Science, Technology, Engineering, Art, and Math) center is a 31,000 square foot building designed by McGranahan Architects and built by Pease Construction. The building was made to improve facilities for art and science and create 11 additional classrooms. The building was opened to students in early 2023.

Traditions

Cabbage Patch
From the roots of Fife's agricultural economy, the Cabbage Patch Olympics were born in 1980. These field games were named in honor of the many cabbage fields, which until the 2000s, were still very prominent in the landscape. The Olympics occur every September as an inter-class competition, as the finale of the fall Associated Student Body (A.S.B) Week. Held on the football field, the competition consists of numerous events, most notably: The cabbage throw, Hula Hoop pass, tug of war, and pyramid building. Each class (sophomore, junior and senior) is awarded points for each event, tallied on large decorated posters. Points are also awarded for color unity (every class member wearing the class color), spirit, and mascot creativity. Traditionally, the class colors are Sophomore: White, Junior: Gold/Yellow, Senior: Blue. Each year a theme for the Olympics is chosen, Cartoon Characters for example, but the cabbage remains the overall emphasis each year. The only prizes for winning the Olympics are the substantial bragging rights, until the next year.

Daffodil Festival
Each year, Fife participates in the Pierce County Daffodil Festival, a regional tradition since 1933. Each year a competition is held in the fall within the school, for the title of Fife Daffodil princess. Once selected, the Fife Princess joins other area school representatives in competition for the title of Daffodil Festival Queen.

Every year, the Fife community builds a parade float, following the particular theme of the parade that year. All of the Fife princesses and the Fife Queen ride, accompanied by the high school band and dance team marching.

Shulapalooza Film Festival 
A film festival was started back in 2004 when John Shula, a video teacher, had Leukemia. A group of students got together and raised money to buy an iPod to help their teacher pass the time in the hospital. Now the film festival is a yearly event which happens in April and takes place in Columbia Junior High's Performing Arts Center. All proceeds from the film festival is donated to Leukemia and Lymphoma Society.

Athletics
Fife competes as a 2A school in the South Puget Sound League (SPSL). However, Fife previously competed In the 2A Nisqually League, as well as a 3A classified school in the Seamount League-Pierce County, Washington. Fife's rival in athletics is White River High School, in Buckley, Washington.

Fall
Football
Cross Country
Cheerleading (women and men)
Tennis (men)
Golf
Soccer (women)
Swimming (women)
Volleyball

Winter
Wrestling(men and women)
Basketball (women)
Basketball (men)
Cheerleading (women and men)
Swimming (men)

Spring
Baseball
Softball
Soccer (men)
Tennis (women)
Track

The Arts

The offerings of the school include:

Band/Wind Ensemble
Concert Choir
Chamber Choir
Jazz Band
Jazz Choir
Drawing
Pottery
Drama
Metalworking

At the high school, the drama program offers three classes: Beginning Acting, Advanced Drama, and Actor's Workshop. Performances take place twice a year, with a dramatic performance in the fall and a musical in the spring. The musical is in collaboration with the Columbia Junior High.

In the past, a magazine set up by the students, Mirror, including student poetry, art, and short stories, was sold around the school but has been discontinued.

Notable alumni

 Edward (Ed) Jeffords (1945–2002), former Texas Assistant Attorney General (served 1985–1992)
 Mark Emmert (1952), Current President, NCAA. Former President, University of Washington.former Chancellor, Louisiana State University, Baton Rouge, La.
 Sarah Silvernail (1975), Professional Volleyball Player (Switzerland),  WSU (Washington State University) Athletic Hall-of-Fame: Volleyball
 Jake Wambold (1996–2000), founding member/guitarist of Aiden
 Frank Dacca, Pierce County District Court Judge.
 Larry Brown, Hall of Fame, Washington State Wrestling Coaches Association, 1995 inductee
 Heidi Pasinetti, former Seattle Seahawks NFL Cheerleader, aka "Sea Gals" (2000–2001)
 Victor Mansaray (2015), professional soccer player
Evan West Washington state underground Bare-knuckle boxing fighter
Kaleb McGary (2019–Present), Offensive tackle for the Atlanta Falcons.

Notable faculty
Jim Lambright, former University of Washington Head Football Coach
Tony Crudo, former soccer player for the North American Soccer League

References

External links
 Fife High School (official site)
 Fife High School: A Historical Perspective

High schools in Pierce County, Washington
Public high schools in Washington (state)